Abhor (or Amba Hor) and Mehraela were a brother and sister who were martyrs for the Christian faith. Etymology of the word "Abhor": from Latin abhorrēre (to shudder at, shrink from), from "ab" (away) and "horrēre" (to bristle, shudder). The book of their "acts" has been lost. Their feast day is celebrated on January 9 in the Coptic Church.

References

Sources

 
Holweck, F. G., A Biographical Dictionary of the Saints. St. Louis, MO: B. Herder Book Co. 1924.

Christian saints in unknown century
Year of birth unknown
Year of death unknown
Christian martyrs
Coptic Orthodox saints
Sibling duos